is a Japanese manga written and illustrated by Toshiki Yui. The manga is licensed in France by Panini Comics.

Manga
Shueisha released 3 bound volumes of the manga between February 2000 and September 2001. Panini Comics released the manga between October 2002 and February 2003 in Germany Planet Manga released the manga between July 12, 2001 and October 24, 2002 in Italy.  It is being distributed online by JManga.

Volume listing

Reception
Manga Sanctuary series of reviews, regards the characters to be "less endearing" than those of Yui's Kirara, and the humor to be "less effective" in the first volume review, goes further in criticism by describing the second volume reading experience as devoid of emotion and the last volume as leaving a bitter after taste so much the manga is ill built and rushed. The French manga dictionary Dicomanga pointed to the author's large usage of computer software which gives a particular yet slightly icy tone to his universe. SplashComics noted that the author used the technique of using photographs as backgrounds. SplashComics described the second volume as being "a typical Yui: Girls and ghosts", noting that although the series was tamer than Kirara, that fanservice was provided via tight shirts and short skirts, and felt the ending was "a little disappointing".

Notes

References

Further reading

External links

Seinen manga
2000 manga
Shueisha manga